Cassa Depositi e Prestiti Equity S.p.A. (aslso known as CDP Equity), until 2016 known as Fondo Strategico Italiano S.p.A., is a majority state-owned Italian sovereign wealth fund established in 2011. Its purpose is to invest in strategic Italian companies to help them to compete globally.

History
The fund was established in 2011 as Fondo Strategico Italiano. Its mandate was to invest in strategic Italian companies to help them to compete globally. The fund's activity is restricted to healthy and profitable Italian businesses, with solid growth prospects, in need of capital injection to enlarge their business and be competitive on a global scale. The initial capital of the fund totalled €1 billion, with 90% of this sum contributed by CDP and 10% from Fintecna. The CDP is ready to inject a total amount of €4 billion.

The fund was set up by the state-controlled lender Cassa Depositi e Prestiti (CDP) on the directive of Economy Minister Giulio Tremonti, emulating a similar fund in France, allegedly after French dairy company Groupe Lactalis SA made a successful takeover bid for Parmalat.

The fund become a member of the International Forum of Sovereign Wealth Funds and signed up to the Santiago Principles on best precise on managing Sovereign Wealth Funds.

In September 2011, Maurizio Tamagnini, formerly a top investment banker at Merrill Lynch, was hired as the CEO of the fund. The position of chairman is filled by Giovanni Gorno Tempini, who was also the CEO of CDP, and is now its chairman of the board.

On 31 March 2016, Fondo Strategico Italiano was renamed into CDP Equity.

On 5 August 2016, Bank of Italy withdrew its 20% stake from CDP Equity.

Investments
In May 2012, the Italian Strategic Fund stated that it would give financial backing to help fund a project that will bring fiber-optic cable to Italy's main cities, as part of the country's attempt to increase high-speed internet connectivity. The €4.5 billion project, led by fibre-optic company Metroweb (was a subsidiary of F2i First Fund via F2i Reti TLC) will receive an initial €200 million from Fondo Strategico Italiano through F2i Reti TLC. There is also an option for the fund to provide a further €300 million.

In May 2012, the Fondo Strategico Italiano acquired an 18.6% stake in biopharmaceutical company Kedrion S.p.A. from holding company Sestant S.p.A. for a total of €150 million. In addition, the Fondo Strategico Italiano has an option to acquire a majority stake in Kedrion from Sestant.

Also in May 2012, the defence and aerospace group Finmeccanica agreed to sell its 14% stake in aero-engine parts maker Avio to the Fondo Strategico Italiano. According to Finmeccanica, the deal is subject to Avio being listed on the Milan stock exchange before the end of 2012. In November 2012, Prime Minister Mario Monti, signed with the Government of Qatar a €2 billion development project; the main investor is Qatar Holding.

It was announced in March 2014, that the Fondo Strategico Italiano had made a non-binding offer for a 30% stake in the Spanish olive oil producer Deoleo.

In July 2016 Enel Open Fiber acquired Metroweb from F2i SGR and Cassa Depositi e Prestiti. However, CDP Equity also acquired 50% stake in Open Fiber.

References

External links

 

Sovereign wealth funds
Government-owned companies of Italy
Partly privatized companies of Italy
Companies based in Milan
Financial services companies of Italy